Toledo United was an American soccer team based in Toledo, Ohio, United States. It played in the Premier League of America (PLA). The team's colors were orange and white.

History

Toledo United was founded in 2016 as an expansion team for the Premier League of America.

In their first season, Toledo United finished second in the East Division, and was eliminated in the first round of playoffs by the eventual champions Milwaukee Bavarians. Toledo United beat Cedar Rapids Rampage United in the third place match.

In an end-of-season message, team president Peter Schinkai said that the club "(had) been approached by a higher league about going full-pro in 2018 or 2019".

Head coaches

Toledo United parted ways with David Hebestreit, its first head coach, following unspecified "off-field issues".

Year-by-year

References

Association football clubs established in 2016
Great Lakes Premier League teams
Sports teams in Toledo, Ohio
2016 establishments in Ohio